Rocket Ride is the seventh full-length album by German power metal band Edguy, released on 20 January 2006.  It features a style that differs from their usual power metal style and is more oriented towards hard rock.

In Europe, the limited first edition was released as a digibook, featuring a photographic history of the group with formerly unreleased pictures from their early days and the bonus live track: "Land of the Miracle".

Track listing

The vinyl release also contained the tracks "Spooks in the Attic", "Blessing In Disguise", "Judas at the Opera", and "The Spirit" from the previously released Superheroes EP.

Personnel 
Band members
Tobias Sammet – vocals
Jens Ludwig – guitar
Dirk Sauer – guitar
Tobias "Eggi" Exxel – bass guitar
Felix Bohnke – drums

Additional musicians
Miro Rodenberg – keyboards, orchestral arrangements
Amanda Somerville, Oliver Hartmann, Ralf Zdiarstek, Thomas Rettke – backing vocals

Production
Sascha Paeth – producer, engineer, mixing, mastering
Philip Colodetti, Olaf Reitmeier – engineers

References

2006 albums
Edguy albums
Nuclear Blast albums